Thomas Stephen Bartram (born 11 February 1986) is an English cricketer. Bartram is a right-handed batsman who bowls right-arm medium-fast. He was born in York, Yorkshire.

While studying for his degree at Durham University, Bartram made his first-class debut for Durham UCCE against Surrey in 2006. He made a further first-class appearance for the university in 2006, against Lancashire. In his two first-class matches, he took 3 wickets at an average of 48.33, with best figures of 2/84.

References

External links
Tom Bartram at ESPNcricinfo

1986 births
Living people
Cricketers from York
Alumni of Durham University
English cricketers
Durham MCCU cricketers
English cricketers of the 21st century